The Pleasure Principle is a 1992 British comedy film directed by David Cohen and starring Peter Firth, Haydn Gwynne and Lysette Anthony. The screenplay concerns a modern-day Don Juan who enjoys relationships with several different women, but is still bemused by the mysteries of the opposite sex.

Cast
 Peter Firth ...  Dick
 Chloe Davies ...  The Girl he never made it with
 Haydn Gwynne ...  Judith
 Lysette Anthony ...  Charlotte
 Sara Mair-Thomas ...  Anne
 Sarah Campbell ...  Linda
 Liam McDermott ...  Clamper
 Stephen Finlay ...  Policeman
 Lynsey Baxter ...  Sammy
 Ian Hogg ...  Malcolm
 Francesca Folan ...  Mrs. Malcolm
 Gordon Warnecke ...  Policeman
 Cliff Parisi ...  Policeman
 Mark Carroll ...  Bridegroom
 Chris Knowles ...  Peter
 Lauren Tauben ...  Betty
 Patrick Tidmarsh ...  Yob

References

External links

1992 films
1992 comedy films
British comedy films
1990s English-language films
1990s British films